The Kentucky Downs Ladies Marathon Stakes is a Grade III American Thoroughbred horse race for fillies and mares that are three years old or older, over a distance of one and five-sixteenths miles on the turf held annually in September at Kentucky Downs racetrack in Franklin, Kentucky during their short turf meeting.  The event currently carries an offered purse of $550,000.

History

With the introduction of Instant Racing in late 2011 the influx of revenue enabled the administration of the track added new events to an expanded racing season. One of these new events one was the Kentucky Downs Ladies Marathon Stakes.

The inaugural running of the event was on 15 September 2012 as the third event on the fourth day of the five day meeting at Kentucky Downs. A field of seven entrants lined up and the event was won by the Dreamfields Farm filly Maid of Heaven who started at 8/1 and was ridden by jockey Leandro Goncalves winning by a head in a time of 2:14.06.

Due to sponsorship the event has had several name changes. In 2015 the Thoroughbred auction house Fasig-Tipton located in Lexington, Kentucky sponsored the event. From 2017 until 2019 Kenneth L. and Sarah K. Ramsey's Ramsey Farms sponsored the event and it was run as the Ramsey Farms Stakes. In 2020 the event was sponsored by the Television Games Network and was held as the TVG Stakes.

The 2016 winner, Al's Gal proved the improving quality of the event by capturing the Grade 1 E. P. Taylor Stakes at Woodbine Racetrack in Canada in her next start.

With the influx of gaming revenue at Kentucky Downs the purse for the event has risen dramatically to nearly $500,000 offered by 2020.

In 2022 the event was upgraded by the Thoroughbred Owners and Breeders Association to a Grade III.

Records 
Speed record:
 miles: 2:08.16  –  Family Way (2021)

Margins:
 lengths – Kitten's Roar  (2017)

Most wins by an owner:
2 – Kenneth L. and Sarah K. Ramsey  (2016, 2017)

Most wins by a jockey:
 No jockey has won the event more than once

Most wins by a trainer:
2 – Michael J. Maker (2016, 2017)

Winners 

Legend:

See also
 List of American and Canadian Graded races

References

Kentucky Downs
Graded stakes races in the United States
Grade 3 stakes races in the United States
Recurring sporting events established in 2012
2012 establishments in Kentucky
Horse races in Kentucky
Turf races in the United States